The Penn State Nittany Lions women represented Penn State University in CHA women's ice hockey during the 2013-14 NCAA Division I women's ice hockey season. The Nittany Lions had a disappointing season, their second in Division I play.

Standings

Offseason
The men and women's hockey teams move into the newly constructed Pegula Ice Arena.

Roster

2013–14 Nittany Lions

Schedule

|-
!colspan=12 style=""| Regular Season

|-
!colspan=12 style=""| CHA Tournament

Awards and honors

Laura Bowman, Forward 2013–14 All-CHA Rookie Team
Taylor Gross, CHA Sportsmanship Award

References

Penn State
Penn State women's ice hockey seasons